Here Come the Seventies was a Canadian documentary television series seen nationally on CTV from 1970 to 1973 normally on Thursday nights at 9:30 (Eastern).

The programs were produced by Philip S. Hobel and Douglas J. Leiterman, who previously produced The Fabulous Sixties series for CTV.  "Communications – The Wired World" was the first episode to air, on 17 September 1970.

The series had a unique opening scene featuring a nude blonde girl, seen from behind, walking from the beach into the surf until she disappears under the surface to swim underwater.  This opening title had various clips of different thought provoking scenes superimposed over the model, of people and new technologies of the time, so as to distract from the nudity which was provocative for early 1970s Canadian television.

Toronto electronic music group Syrinx produced the program's theme song, "Tillicum", which became a minor Canadian radio hit in 1971.

Episodes

References

1970 Canadian television series debuts
1973 Canadian television series endings
CTV Television Network original programming
1970s Canadian documentary television series